Pilley may refer to:
Places
Pilley, Gloucestershire, England
Pilley, Hampshire, England
Pilley, South Yorkshire, England

People
 Cameron Pilley (born 1982), professional squash player
 Dorothy Pilley Richards (1894-1986), prominent female mountaineer
 Teddy (Thaddeus) Pilley (1909-1982), conference interpreter

See also
Pilley's Island, Newfoundland and Labrador